Crowley's Ridge Parkway is a  National Scenic Byway in northeast Arkansas and the Missouri Bootheel along Crowley's Ridge in the United States. Motorists can access the parkway from US Route 49 (US 49) at its southern terminus near the Helena Bridge over the Mississippi River outside Helena-West Helena, Arkansas, or from Missouri Route 25 (Route 25) near Kennett, Missouri. The parkway runs along Crowley's Ridge, a unique geological formation, and also parts of the St. Francis National Forest, the Mississippi River and the Mississippi Alluvial Plain. Along the route are many National Register of Historic Places properties, Civil War battlefields, parks, and other archeological and culturally significant points.

Crowley's Ridge Parkway is not a separately designated route, but a collection of United States highways, Arkansas state highways, Missouri state routes, Missouri supplemental routes, Arkansas state highway business routes, county roads, and city streets. The route also briefly overlaps the Great River Road in Arkansas. The parkway was designated as an Arkansas Scenic Byway in 1997 as a motor route which allowed the traveler to experience the Southern heritage of the area. The National Scenic Byway designation came the following year, with an extension into Missouri in 2000.

Route description

Arkansas

The majority of the route is in Arkansas, and the parkway begins in Phillips County, Arkansas, in Helena-West Helena very near the Helena Bridge over the Mississippi River. Beginning at US Route 49 (US 49) and running north with US 49 Business (US 49B), the route passes historic properties including the Delta Cultural Center, the Jerome Bonaparte Pillow House, the Perry Street Historic District and the site of the Battle of Helena, an American Civil War battle fought in 1863. Upon entering the center of Helena, the byway splits from US 49B and winds along city streets before again following US 49B to West Helena. The parkway turns onto Highway 242 (AR 242) headed north out of town into the St. Francis National Forest, where it turns onto Storm Creek Road (County Route 217, CR 217). Winding through the forest as a narrow two-lane road, the parkway passes Storm Creek Lake and enters Lee County (now following CR 217).

The route continues north onto CR 221 and later CR 239 when it meets Highway 44 near Bear Creek Lake. Following Highway 44 northwest into Marianna, Crowley's Ridge Parkway continues along Highway 44 (Martin Luther King Jr. Drive) until Poplar Street, where it turns north onto Chestnut Street. Near this intersection the byway passes the Marianna Commercial Historic District, the Lee County Courthouse, and a monument for Confederate General Robert E. Lee. Chestnut Street becomes Highway 1 Business before turning north onto US 79/AR 1. Crowley's Ridge Parkway follows Highway 1 north into Haynes and St. Francis County. Just south of Forrest City, the parkway turns onto Highway 1B to downtown Forrest City. The route turns onto Front Street at the St. Francis County Museum, then onto Izard Street as it passes the First United Methodist Church and has a junction with US 70. Crowley's Ridge Parkway follows US 70 for two blocks before turning left onto Forrest Street. Now facing north, the parkway passes the historic Campbell House and the Stuart Springs before joining with Highway 284 and crossing over Interstate 40/US 63 (I-40/US 63). Continuing north, Crowley's Ridge Parkway passes East Arkansas Community College before forming the western boundary of Village Creek State Park and entering Cross County.

The parkway travels among many different unique species of animals and plants, and meets historical sites such as the Parkin Archeological State Park, Chalk Bluff Battlefield and the Battle of Helena Battlefields. The Parkway also runs through Lake Poinsett State Park, which offers numerous campgrounds to travelers. The parkway runs through numerous parks, including Chalk Bluff Battlefield Park, Crowley's Ridge State Park, Delta Cultural Center, Hemingway-Pfeiffer Museum and Educational Center, Lake Frierson State Park, Lake Poinsett State Park, Louisiana Purchase State Park, Parker Pioneer Homestead, Parkin Archeological State Park, Southland Greyhound Park, and the Village Creek State Park.  In Missouri the route runs past Morris State Park.

Cities along the Arkansas portion of the route include Piggott, Paragould, Jonesboro, Wynne, Forrest City, Marianna, West Helena and Helena.

Missouri
Crowley's Ridge Parkway continues through unique countryside and American Civil War era battlefields in the Missouri Bootheel. It terminates at Business Route 25 in Malden after  in the state.

History

The route was designated a state scenic byway in Arkansas in 1997 and a National Scenic Byway in 1998. The Missouri scenic byway designation was granted in 2000.

Major intersections

See also

References

External links
 Delta Byways Brochure

 
National Scenic Byways
Roads in Arkansas
Roads in Missouri
Transportation in Phillips County, Arkansas
Transportation in Lee County, Arkansas
Cross
Transportation in Poinsett County, Arkansas
Transportation in Craighead County, Arkansas
Transportation in Greene County, Arkansas
Transportation in Clay County, Arkansas
Transportation in Dunklin County, Missouri
1997 establishments in Arkansas
1997 establishments in Missouri